Melvin Antwan Harris (born May 29, 1977) is a former professional American football player who was a safety for six seasons for the New England Patriots and Cleveland Browns of the National Football League (NFL). He was drafted in the sixth round of the 2000 NFL Draft. He won three Super Bowls with the Patriots in 2001, 2003 and 2004. He is best remembered for taking a lateral from Troy Brown after a blocked field goal and running 49 yards for a touchdown in the 2001 AFC Championship game against the Pittsburgh Steelers.

In Super Bowl XXXVI, Harris made a crucial play, forcing a fumble by Rams receiver Ricky Proehl, which was recovered by teammate Terrell Buckley and returned to the Rams' 25-yard line, setting up the Patriots' only offensive touchdown of the game, a pass from Tom Brady to David Patten that brought the Patriots' lead to 14–3.

References 

1977 births
Living people
Players of American football from Raleigh, North Carolina
American football defensive backs
Virginia Cavaliers football players
New England Patriots players
Cleveland Browns players
Ravenscroft School alumni